The 2014–15 Euroleague qualifying rounds was a tournament held before the 2014–15 Euroleague that determined which team would play in the regular season. Eight teams participated in a single-venue tournament format that was played in Ostend, Belgium from 23 to 26 September.

Teams
The eight teams (in brackets, positions in their national leagues) are:

  ČEZ Nymburk (1)
  VEF Rīga (2)
  Stelmet Zielona Góra (2)
  Strasbourg (2)
  Telenet Oostende (1)
  UNICS (3)
  Hapoel Jerusalem (3)
  ASVEL (7)

Draw
Teams will be seeded into four pots of two teams in accordance with the Club Ranking, based on their performance in European competitions during a three-year period and the teams granted a Wild Card by ECA will be seeded above the rest of the teams.

Notes:
^ denotes a team with a wildcard granted.
† indicates a team with points applying the minimum for the league it plays.

Bracket

First round

Second round

Third round

References

External links
Qualifying rounds official page

2014–15 Euroleague